Band saw boxes are boxes made out of wood using only a bandsaw for cutting them out. The wood may be a solid block, a laminated block or a log from the woodpile. Whereas most boxes have straight sides and square corners, band saw boxes have virtually no restrictions as to shape. They can be oval, heart-shaped, lizard-shaped, or any shape the maker can think of. Other tools such as belt sanders and drum sanders can be used to shape and sand the box smooth. Relief cuts are always needed if you are going to make a bandsaw box. If you don't, the box always seems to fall apart. If the bandsaw has a little hitch in it the box usually snaps in two.

There are multiple techniques for constructing band saw boxes.

The primary technique starts by cutting the main shape of the box. Then a 1/8" to 1/4" piece of wood is cut off what is to become the back. The drawer shape is cut within the main shape, which involves cutting through the main body, and the body must be glued back together. Once the drawer shape is cut, the usual technique is to remove 1/8" to 1/4" of material from both the front and rear of the drawer shape to be used as faces. The remaining stock is then reduced or hollowed out to produce a drawer or cavity. The front and rear drawer faces are glued back to the remaining hollowed drawer stock, and the back that was cut off is glued to the main body. A handle can be added to the front of the drawer if desired.

Woodworking